{{DISPLAYTITLE:C17H18N2O}}
The molecular formula C17H18N2O (molar mass: 266.34 g/mol, exact mass: 266.1419 u) may refer to:

 5-Benzyloxytryptamine (5-BT)
 Conolidine

Molecular formulas